Eulophia taiwanensis is a species of plant in the family Orchidaceae. It is found in Taiwan and the Philippines.

Synonyms 
The following are heterotypic synonyms :
Eulophia taiwanensis Hayata, 1911 
Eulophia kitamurae Masam, 1932
Eulophia segawae Fukuy, 1934
Eulophia graminea var. kitamurae Masam.) S.S.Ying, 1977

References 

Orchids of the Philippines
Orchids of Taiwan
dentata
Endangered plants
Taxonomy articles created by Polbot
Taxobox binomials not recognized by IUCN